David Sheldon may refer to:

David Sheldon (wrestler) (1953–2007), American professional wrestler, better known by his ring name Angel of Death
David Newton Sheldon (1807–1889), president of Colby College, Maine, United States
David Sheldon, character in Adventure
David Sheldon (director) of Peopletoys
Mac Lethal (David McCleary Sheldon, born 1981), rapper

See also
David Shelton (disambiguation)